Sasakiconcha is a genus of sea snails, marine gastropod mollusks in the family Anatomidae.

Species
Species within the genus Sasakiconcha include:
 Sasakiconcha elegantissima Geiger, 2006

References

 Geiger D.L. (2012) Monograph of the little slit shells. Volume 1. Introduction, Scissurellidae. pp. 1-728. Volume 2. Anatomidae, Larocheidae, Depressizonidae, Sutilizonidae, Temnocinclidae. pp. 729–1291. Santa Barbara Museum of Natural History Monographs Number 7

External links
 Geiger D.L. 2006. Sasakiconcha elegantissima new genus and new species (Gastropoda: Vetigastropoda: Anatomidae?) with disjointly coiled base. The Nautilus 120(2): 45-51

Anatomidae
Monotypic gastropod genera